Jakob Aleksič (Obrež, Slovenia, 30 May 1897 – 2 October 1980, Ljubljana) was a Slovenian theologian.

He was professor at the high school for theology in Maribor. From 1947 to 1980 he was professor at the Faculty of Theology in Ljubljana. He studied the Bible and its history.

Works 
 Kristus in njegovo kraljestvo (Christ and His Kingdom, 1961)
 4. prevod Svetega pisma (Fourth Translation of the Holy Bible, 1961)
 Malo sveto pismo (Little Holy Bible, 1967)

References 
 Veliki slovenski leksikon, Mladinska knjiga (2003)

1897 births
1980 deaths
Slovenian theologians
Academic staff of the University of Ljubljana
20th-century Slovenian Roman Catholic priests
People from the Municipality of Središče ob Dravi
Yugoslav Roman Catholic priests